Port of Oskarshamn is a seaport in Oskarshamn, Kalmar County, in southeastern Sweden.

Cargo handling
The port handles most types of goods; containers, dry bulk cargo and wet bulk cargo. The facilities are: Total quay-length of 2.7 km, maximum depth 11 m, Roro-facilities, cranes, warehouses, oil and chemical storage.

Shipyard
Oskarshamnsvarvet Sweden AB is a shipyard operating on the south side of the harbor. The shipyard was first established in 1863 and has launched about 500 ships in total. The shipyard is equipped with floating drydock, gantry crane, slipway and 318 m of quay.

Passenger traffic
From the port there are also ferry lines to Gotland, Öland and national park Blå Jungfrun.

References

 Port of Oskarshamn official site 

Oskarshamn
Buildings and structures in Kalmar County
Oskarshamn